Mount Penrose, known locally as Penrose, is the easternmost summit of the Dickson Range, a subrange of the Chilcotin Ranges, near Gold Bridge, British Columbia, Canada and immediately above and to the west of Gun Lake.  It was named for Senator Boies Penrose, of Philadelphia, Pennsylvania, who was the first to climb it, during a hunting expedition led by famed guide W.G. "Bill" Manson.

Climate

Based on the Köppen climate classification, Mount Penrose is located in a subarctic climate zone of western North America. Most weather fronts originate in the Pacific Ocean, and travel east toward the Coast Mountains where they are forced upward by the range (Orographic lift), causing them to drop their moisture in the form of rain or snowfall. As a result, the Coast Mountains experience high precipitation, especially during the winter months in the form of snowfall. Temperatures can drop below −20 °C with wind chill factors below −30 °C. The months July through September offer the most favorable weather for climbing Mount Penrose.

See also
Mount Penrose (Montana)
Penrose Peak (disambiguation)

References

External links
 Mt. Penrose weather: Mountain Forecast

Bridge River Country
Chilcotin Ranges
Penrose
Lillooet Land District